, provisional designation: , is an asteroid and suspected contact binary on an eccentric orbit, classified as a large near-Earth object and potentially hazardous asteroid of the Apollo group, approximately  in diameter. It was discovered on 8 September 1999, at a magnitude of 18, by astronomers of the LINEAR program using its 1-meter telescope at the Lincoln Laboratory's Experimental Test Site near Socorro, New Mexico, United States. The asteroid is likely of carbonaceous composition and has a rotation period of 17.08 hours.

Description 

 orbits the Sun at a distance of 0.6–4.7 AU once every 4 years and 4 months (1,571 days; semi-major axis of 2.64 AU). Its orbit has a high eccentricity of 0.77 and an inclination of 7° with respect to the ecliptic.

The asteroid's observation arc begins with a precovery taken at Palomar Observatory in January 1995. It is known that  passed  from Earth on 27 August 1969. During the 1969 close approach the asteroid reached about apparent magnitude 8.8. The similarly-sized 4179 Toutatis also reached that brightness in September 2004.

Other sources calculate a smaller diameter of 1.63 kilometers based on a dated assumption, that the object is a stony rather than a carbonaceous asteroid. The two visible lobes suggest that  is a tight binary asteroid or contact binary. About 10–15% of near-Earth asteroids larger than 200 meters are expected to be contact binary asteroids with two lobes in mutual contact.

Numbering and naming 

This minor planet was numbered by the Minor Planet Center on 13 November 2008. As of 2018, it has not been named.

Notes

References

External links 
 Arecibo images from 2012
 Asteroid Lightcurve Database (LCDB), query form (info )
 Dictionary of Minor Planet Names, Google books
 Asteroids and comets rotation curves, CdR – Observatoire de Genève, Raoul Behrend
 
 
 

192642
192642
192642
192642
192642
20120314
19990908